(1909 – June 15, 1990) was a Japanese swimmer who competed at the 1928 Summer Olympics in Amsterdam.
Arai was a member of the Japanese team which won the silver medal for the 4 × 200 meter freestyle relay event at the 1928 Amsterdam Olympics. He placed fourth in the semifinal of the 1500 meter freestyle event, but did not advance to the finals. He also qualified for the semifinals of the 400 meter freestyle event, but did not start.

External links
Olympic profile

1909 births
1990 deaths
Olympic swimmers of Japan
Swimmers at the 1928 Summer Olympics
Olympic silver medalists for Japan
Japanese male freestyle swimmers
Medalists at the 1928 Summer Olympics
Olympic silver medalists in swimming
20th-century Japanese people